The Systematic Reviews in Pharmacy is a monthly peer-reviewed open-access medical journal covering pharmaceutics, biopharmaceutics, pharmaceutical chemistry, pharmacognosy, pharmacology, pharmaceutical analysis, pharmacy practice,  clinical and Biomedical sciences.

Abstracting and indexing 
The journal is abstracted and indexed in:

According to Scopus, the journal has a 2019 CiteScore of 3.9

References

External links 
 

Open access journals
Monthly journals
English-language journals
Pharmacology journals
Publications established in 2009
2009 establishments in Malaysia
Medknow Publications academic journals
Biomedical engineering journals